The African Women's Youth Handball Championship is the official competition for youth women's national handball teams of Africa, organized by the African Handball Confederation, under the supervision of the International Handball Federation and takes place every two years. In addition to crowning the African champions, the tournament also serves as a qualifying tournament for the Youth World Championship.

Summary

Most successful national teams

Participating nations

See also
 African Women's Junior Handball Championship
 African Men's Youth Handball Championship

External links
 African Youth Handball Championship - news.abidjan.net

Youth
Youth handball
Women's handball competitions
Youth sport in Africa
Women's sports competitions in Africa